Tunn is a surname. Notable people with the surname include:

 Michael Tunn (born 1974), Australian radio announcer and television presenter
 Susanne Tunn (born 1958), German sculptor

See also
 Tun (disambiguation)